Kai Joachim Nürnberger (born 7 June 1966) is a German former basketball player. He competed in the men's tournament at the 1992 Summer Olympics.

References

External links
 

1966 births
Living people
Basketball players at the 1992 Summer Olympics
BSC Saturn Köln players
German expatriate basketball people in the United States
German men's basketball players
Olympic basketball players of Germany
People from Wolfenbüttel
Point guards
Skyliners Frankfurt players
Southern Illinois Salukis men's basketball players
1994 FIBA World Championship players
Sportspeople from Lower Saxony